Gheen is an unincorporated community in Gheen Territory, Saint Louis County, Minnesota, United States, located one mile east of Gheen Corner on Willow River Road.

The community of Gheen is located seven miles south of Orr, and 12 miles north of Cook.

U.S. Highway 53 is nearby. Gheen is located within the Kabetogama State Forest.

History
A post office called Gheen was established in 1906, and remained in operation until 1993. The community was named for Edward Hickman Gheen, a Navy officer.

References

 Rand McNally Road Atlas – 2007 edition – Minnesota entry
 Official State of Minnesota Highway Map – 2011/2012 edition

Unincorporated communities in Minnesota
Unincorporated communities in St. Louis County, Minnesota